The 50th Annual Miss Puerto Rico Universe competition was held in the fall of 2004 in Puerto Rico. Cynthia Olavarría won the pageant and represented Puerto Rico at Miss Universe 2005 in Bangkok, Thailand, where she finished as 1st runner-up.

Results

Notes
 Miss Salinas, Cynthia Olavarría, previously competed at Miss Puerto Rico Universe 2003, representing San Juan, where she placed 1st runner-up. She represented Puerto Rico at Miss Universe 2005 in Bangkok, Thailand where she finished as 1st runner-up. This was the highest Puerto Rico had placed since Denise Quiñones' win in 2001 until Zuleyka Rivera's win the following year.
 Miss Barranquitas, Yara Lasanta, later competed at Miss World Puerto Rico 2009 where she finished as 1st runner-up. She was later appointed as Miss World Puerto Rico 2010 and represented Puerto Rico at Miss World 2010 where she placed in Top 25 and won the Beach Beauty Fast Track Award.
 Miss San Juan, Uma Blasini, later competed at Miss Puerto Rico Universe 2007, representing Guayanilla, where she won. She represented Puerto Rico at Miss Universe 2007 in Mexico City, Mexico where she failed to place in the semi-finals.

References

Puerto Rico 2005
2005 beauty pageants
2005 in Puerto Rico